Arnold Matteus (13 December 1897 – 30 November 1986) was an Estonian architect.

Matteus was born present-day Võru Parish. 1921 he graduated from the University of Tartu in mathematics. 1925 he graduated from Technische Universität Darmstadt.

He participated on Estonian War of Independence.

1926–1935 and 1940–1960 he was the principal architect of Tartu.

Works

 Tamme Stadium (1928)
 Oskar Luts Home Museum
 Ugala konvendihoone

References

1897 births
1986 deaths
Estonian architects
University of Tartu alumni
Technische Universität Darmstadt alumni
Estonian military personnel of the Estonian War of Independence
People from Võru Parish